Western Secondary School is a secondary school (grades 9 through 12) located in Amherstburg, Ontario and managed by the Greater Essex County District School Board.

History
Built in 1975 with an addition in 1994 and 2000, Western Secondary School is primarily a technological school that is equipped with many shops including a machine shop, wood shop, paint shop, culinary kitchen and greenhouse.

Future
In October 2016 the Ministry of Education awarded a $24.3 million grant for the construction of a new Amherstburg High School, which consolidated the General Amherst High School and Western SS communities. The site of the new school is located at the south end of Centennial Park off Simcoe Street between Fryer Street and Victoria Street South which was sold to the school board from the Town of Amherstburg in January 2018. Construction began in October 2020 and was completed in September 2022. The name of the new school is North Star High School.

See also
List of high schools in Ontario

References 
 Western Secondary School

Educational institutions established in 1922
High schools in Essex County, Ontario
1922 establishments in Ontario